Paul Dean Gibson (June 20, 1948 – May 23, 1975)  was a wide receiver in the National Football League.

Career
A track star at University of Texas at El Paso, Gibson won the 1970 NCAA high hurdles title. He was drafted in the eighth round of the 1972 NFL Draft by the Buffalo Bills and was a member of the Green Bay Packers that season. He played at the collegiate level at the University of Texas at El Paso. After appearing in one game for the Packers, he signed with the International Track Association in 1974.

He died from injuries suffered in an auto accident in 1975.

See also
 List of Green Bay Packers players

References

People from Paris, Arkansas
Track and field athletes in the National Football League
Green Bay Packers players
American football wide receivers
American male hurdlers
UTEP Miners football players
UTEP Miners men's track and field athletes
Track and field athletes from Arkansas
Players of American football from Arkansas
1948 births
1975 deaths
Road incident deaths in Texas